The 1975 Louisville Open, also known as the First National Tennis Classic, was a men's tennis tournament played on outdoor clay courts at the Louisville Tennis Center in Louisville, Kentucky, USA. It was the sixth edition of the tournament and was held from 28 July through 5 August 1975. The tournament was part of the Grand Prix tennis circuit and categorized in Group AA. The singles final was delayed by one day due to rain and was won by defending champion Guillermo Vilas who received the $16,000 first prize money. The doubles final was not played due to rain and the prize money was shared.

Finals

singles
 Guillermo Vilas defeated  Ilie Năstase 6–4, 6–3

doubles
 Wojciech Fibak /  Guillermo Vilas and  Anand Amritraj /  Vijay Amritraj not played

References

External links
ITF tournament details

Louisville Open
Louisville Open
Louisville Open
Louisville Open